Robert James "R. J." Allen (born April 17, 1990) is an American former professional soccer player. Predominantly a right-sided defender, Allen is the older brother of soccer player Brandon Allen.

Career

High school 
Allen attended St. Joseph High School in Metuchen, New Jersey, between 2004 and 2008 where he played soccer all four years.

College and amateur 
Allen played four years of college soccer at Monmouth University between 2008 and 2011.

While at college, Allen appeared for USL PDL side Central Jersey Spartans in 2010 and 2011.

Professional 
On January 17, 2012, Allen was selected 5th overall in the 2012 MLS Supplemental Draft by Chivas USA. Allen didn't sign with Chivas USA, instead later signing with Danish side Skive IK in February 2013.

Allen returned to the United States and had trials with D.C United, Orlando City, New York Red Bulls, and the New York Cosmos ahead of the 2015 MLS season. During this time, Allen was contacted by New York City FC to train with David Villa before the beginning of the season, which he did with future Red Bull Mike Grella. Allen was not offered a professional contract prior to the 2015 season, taking a job as a youth soccer coach on Staten Island instead.

New York City FC
After a slow start to their inaugural season, New York City FC offered Allen a contract on May 2, 2015. Allen made his NYCFC debut the following day as a substitute in a 3–1 loss to the Seattle Sounders. Allen got his first start the following week in the first Hudson River Derby against the New York Red Bulls, during which he assisted Patrick Mullins on the team's only goal in a 2–1 loss. Allen made 13 starts in 14 appearances during the 2015 season, drifting in and out of favor under manager Jason Kries, who was fired on November 2, 2015 after a disappointing season.

Under new manager Patrick Vieira, Allen solidified himself as the first choice right or left back.

On April 27, 2016, Allen scored his first MLS goal in a 1–1 tie against the Montreal Impact. During a match on May 15, 2016 against the Portland Timbers, Allen set up the first goal by playing a 50-yard through ball to striker David Villa. This pass by Allen has been called the one of the 'greatest assists in NYCFC history' by some reporters. Allen recorded his second assist of the season on 29 May against Orlando City, in a performance that would earn him MLS team of the week honors.

RJ finished the season with 6 assists. This was the joint highest total in the league for a defender.

Orlando City
In December 2017, Allen was traded by NYCFC to Orlando City SC in exchange for a third-round pick in the 2018 MLS SuperDraft, reuniting him with manager Jason Kreis. After one season in Orlando which also saw the departure of Kreis, Allen was waived by the team on February 6, 2019.

FC Motown
In April 2019, Allen joined National Premier Soccer League side FC Motown ahead of the 2019 season. He made six appearances for the team, including starting in a First Round loss to New York Red Bulls U-23 in the 2019 U.S. Open Cup. He left the team at the end of the regular season.

Philadelphia Union
In July 2019, Allen rejoined the American top flight and signed with Philadelphia Union competing in MLS. Allen was released by Philadelphia at the end of the season due to injury was unable to regain his form and soon retired from the MLS.

Career statistics

Honors 
 New York City:
MLS Team of the Week:
 2015: Week 30
 2016: Week 13
FIFA Team of the Week:
 FIFA 2016: Week 42
NYCFC Player of the Month:
 2016: May

Endorsements
In 2017, Allen became an ambassador for Concave football boot, and always plays with the Concave Aura+ cleats.

References

External links
 
 
 Concave Soccer Cleats
https://instagram.com/rj_allen27

1990 births
Living people
People from Old Bridge Township, New Jersey
St. Joseph High School (Metuchen, New Jersey) alumni
Sportspeople from Middlesex County, New Jersey
Monmouth Hawks men's soccer players
Central Jersey Spartans players
Skive IK players
New York City FC players
Orlando City SC players
Philadelphia Union players
Association football defenders
Soccer players from New Jersey
Chivas USA draft picks
USL League Two players
Major League Soccer players
National Premier Soccer League players
American expatriate soccer players
Expatriate men's footballers in Denmark
American soccer players